Sounds to Consume is Sonic Boom Six's second release for Moon Ska Europe and comprises four new tracks alongside the four tracks from their original release, The Turbo EP. It has since been reissued twice, firstly as the 'Champion Edition' which comprised the original 8 tracks and 8 bonus tracks, and the subsequent reissue of the Champion Edition which was remastered as well as featuring a further 2 bonus tracks. Both Champion Editions are housed in digipack packaging and contain a different booklet to the original release.

The original edition, as well as the first pressing of the Champion Edition, were limited to 1,000 copies each.

Track listing

All versions contain enhanced CD-ROM videos.

The first track, "The Rape of Punk to Come", is a title parody of Refused's album The Shape of Punk to Come.

External links
page on Moon Ska Europe website

Sonic Boom Six albums
2004 albums